La Domenica Sportiva is an Italian television sport programme. It has being broadcast since 1953, it has being one of Rai's longest running television shows.

References

External links

Official site

1953 Italian television series debuts
Association football television series
1950s Italian television series
1960s Italian television series
1970s Italian television series
1980s Italian television series
1990s Italian television series
2000s Italian television series
2010s Italian television series
2020s Italian television series
Italian sports television series
Italian-language television shows
RAI original programming